The Citizen's Account Program in Saudi Arabia is a cash transfer program that started in December 2017. The program is adopted and implemented by The Ministry of Labor and Social Development. Through the programme, citizens in Saudi Arabia get monthly payments from the state. Saudi Arabia is doing many reforms to reduce the country's dependency on oil revenues, but many of these reforms have overburdened some citizens. The Citizen's Account, which is a form of basic income, is designed to balance this up, to avoid burdening lower income families which would otherwise occur despite higher prices for oil, fuel and energy. This financial support comes as a response to the increase the costs of electricity and petrol as well as the imposing of VAT on many products.

In December 2017, immediately before the programme began, more than 3.7 million households had registered, representing 13 million people, or more than half the population. , between 1/5 and 1/3 of Saudi residents are estimated to be non-citizens.

As of March 2021, the programme has officially paid out over £400,000,000

Objectives of the Program 

 developing the services given to citizens
 improving the government's expenditure and operation efficiency
 providing assistant to citizens with a high level of transparency and efficiency.

See also

Economy of Saudi Arabia
Guaranteed minimum income

References 

Universal basic income
2017 establishments in Saudi Arabia